The National Organization on Fetal Alcohol Syndrome (NOFAS) is a non-profit public health charitable organization focused on the issue of fetal alcohol syndrome and fetal alcohol spectrum disorders (FASD).  NOFAS was founded in 1990 and advocates for improved public policy for people affected by FASD, provides resources for people living with FASD, and educates the public about FASD and the risks of drinking alcohol while pregnant.  NOFAS has a network of over 40 affiliates around the United States.

NOFAS works in collaboration with several U.S. government agencies, such as the Centers for Disease Control and Prevention (CDC).  In 2010, the CDC awarded a four-year cooperative agreement to NOFAS to increase FASD support services.

Tom Donaldson serves as director of NOFAS.  He has been interviewed for the Chicago Tribune.  Kathy Mitchell serves as vice president and national spokesperson.  Ms. Mitchell has written about FASD for The Partnership at Drugfree.org.  The NOFAS Advisory Board includes many prominent supporters, including U.S. Senators Lisa Murkowski, John McCain, Orrin Hatch, and Tom Coburn, FASD experts Sterling Clarren, Kenneth Jones, and Philip May, TV producer Neal Baer, and others.

NOFAS takes the position that no amount of alcohol is safe to consume during pregnancy and opposes the view that light drinking during pregnancy (an occasional glass of wine) is safe.

NOFAS programs include:
 Information clearinghouse of FASD facts and research
 Support group for families with FASD
 Peer mentoring group of birth mothers to children with FASD (Circle of Hope Birth Mothers Network)
 Medical student curriculum
 Public awareness campaigns, social media outreach
 Trainings on FASD for doctors and public health professionals
 Legislative/public policy advocacy

External links 

 NOFAS website
 NOFAS Facebook page
 NOFAS on Twitter

References 

Medical and health organizations based in Washington, D.C.
1990 establishments in the United States
1990 establishments in Washington, D.C.
Organizations established in 1990